Lagos State in Nigeria is home to several notable tourist sites. Tourism in Lagos State was first fashioned in 1995 by the Military Administration; ever since then, tourism sites have received thousands of visitors.

In order to increase the viability of tourism, arts and culture in the state, the previous state governor Akinwunmi Ambode in 2015 renamed the tourism ministry responsibilities to the Ministry of Tourism Arts and Culture.

Parks, galleries, and conservation

Lekki Conservation Centre 

The Lekki Conservation Centre is located in the centre of Lekki. The tourist area, which covers a land area of 78 hectares, is located on the Lekki Peninsula, next to the Lekki Lagoon, and near the Lagos Lagoon. The LCC’s  401-metre long canopy walkway is the longest canopy walkway in Africa. It is a suspended swinging bridge walkway, featuring several types of vegetation and animals.

Freedom Park, Lagos 
Freedom Park is a memorial and leisure park area in the middle of downtown Lagos in Lagos Island, Nigeria;  the park symbolizes the transformation of colonial prison to a symbol of freedom. Activities at the park include cultural shows and events, continental and traditional meals, and live music.

Nike Art Gallery 
Nike Art Gallery is an art gallery in Lekki, Lagos, The gallery is one of the largest collections of indigenous Nigerian artwork, and is currently the largest privately-owned art gallery in Africa.

Beaches 
Lagos state has over 700 km of Atlantic sandy beaches with about 20 between the West of Badagry and East of Lekki. They include:
 Atlas Cove, Apapa
 Bar Beach, Victoria Island
 Elegushi Beach
 Tarkwa Bay Beach
 Topo Island, Badagry.

References

Lagos
 
Lagos
Lagos-related lists